The 1993 Ballon d'Or, given to the best football player in Europe as judged by a panel of sports journalists from UEFA member countries, was awarded to Roberto Baggio on 28 December 1993.

Rankings

References

External links
 France Football Official Ballon d'Or page

1993
1993–94 in European football